One classical breakdown of economic activity distinguishes three sectors:

 Primary: involves the retrieval and production of raw-material commodities, such as corn, coal, wood or iron. Miners, farmers and fishermen are all workers in the primary sector.
 Secondary: involves the transformation of raw or intermediate materials into goods, as in steel into cars, or textiles into clothing. Builders and dressmakers work in the secondary sector.
 Tertiary: involves the supplying of services to consumers and businesses, such as babysitting, cinemas or banking. Shopkeepers and accountants work in the tertiary sector.

In the 20th century, economists began to suggest that traditional tertiary services could be further distinguished from "quaternary" and quinary service sectors. Economic activity in the hypothetical quaternary sector comprises information- and knowledge-based services, while quinary services include industries related to human services and hospitality.

Economic theories divide economic sectors further into economic industries.

Historic evolution 
An economy may include several sectors that evolved in successive phases:

 The ancient economy built mainly on the basis of subsistence farming.
 The industrial revolution lessened the role of subsistence farming, converting land-use to more extensive and monocultural forms of agriculture over the last three centuries. Economic growth took place mostly in the mining, construction and manufacturing industries. 
 In the economies of modern consumer societies, services, finance, and technology—the knowledge economy—play an increasingly significant role.

Even in modern times, developing countries tend to rely more on the first two sectors, in contrast to developed countries.

By ownership 
An economy can also be divided along different lines:

 Public sector or state sector
 Private sector or privately run businesses
 Voluntary sector

See also 
 Three-sector theory
 Jean Fourastié
 Industry classification
 International Standard Industrial Classification
 North American Industry Classification System – a sample application of sector-oriented analysis
 Division of labour
 Economic development

References 

 01